The Arizona-Sonora Manufacturing Company Machine Shop is a historic building in Nogales, Arizona. It was erected in 1901, and designed in the Mission Revival architectural style. The company was the largest employer in Nogales from 1900 to 1920. The building has been listed on the National Register of Historic Places since August 29, 1985.

References

National Register of Historic Places in Santa Cruz County, Arizona
Mission Revival architecture in Arizona
Commercial buildings completed in 1901